This is a list of extreme points and elevation in Israel. The "base" listing includes East Jerusalem and the Golan Heights, which were unilaterally annexed by Israel in 1967 and 1981 respectively; Israel within the green line only is listed separately. Relative to the "base" listing, no changes are made by including the West Bank; the  Gaza Strip is not included owing to Israel's official withdrawal in 2005.

Elevation
The Lowest point: Dead Sea:  (Also, the lowest point on Earth)
The Highest point: Mount Hermon  (in the Israeli-controlled Golan Heights, unilaterally annexed in 1981)
Within the Green Line: Mount Meron:

Extreme points
Northernmost point (including Golan Heights): Mount Hermon:   (in the Israeli-controlled Golan Heights, unilaterally annexed in 1981)
Northernmost point (excluding Golan Heights): on the border with Lebanon, north of Metula:  (within the Green Line)
Southernmost point: Taba Border Crossing: 
Easternmost point (including Golan Heights): On the Blue Line border with Syria, near Al-Rafid, Syria (in the Israeli-controlled Golan Heights, unilaterally annexed in 1981): 
Easternmost point (excluding Golan Heights): the border with the Golan Heights (near Kibbutz Dan, Israel, on Si'on River):  (within the Green Line)
Westernmost point: Tripoint border with Egypt and the Gaza Strip:

See also
Extreme points of Earth
List of countries by northernmost point
List of countries by southernmost point
List of countries by easternmost point
List of countries by westernmost point

References

Geography of Israel
Israel